Mary Pannal (died 1603) was an English herbalist and cunning woman who was accused of, and executed for, witchcraft in 1603.

Biography
Mary lived in Ledston, West Yorkshire where she had a reputation as a cunning woman or witch. She was accused of witchcraft following the death of a young child named William Witham in 1593 to whom she had administered a herbal mixture.

The spelling of her married name was possibly Pannell and she may have been born Marye Tailer. In the Kippax Parish Registers 
an entry for the year 1558 shows 'John Pannell & Marye Tailer [9th] of Julie (July) married.'  Subsequently, in 1568 Raphe Pannell who may have been their son is shown as having been born but died the same year, with an Elizabeth Pannell being born in 1569. Then in 1570, there is a record of a baptism of 'John Pannell the [15th] of June...' In 1575 there is another record of baptism 'Agnes Pannell the [19th] of Sept...'. 

The location and method of her execution are unclear; she was either hanged in York after her trial or burnt at the stake near Castleford.

Legacy

The ghost of Mary Pannal is said to haunt the woods near Pannal Hill, near Castleford. The suggestion is that if someone sees her ghost, which will be leading a horse, then someone close to them will die.

A play inspired by her biography, Maleficium! The Life, Trial, and Death of Mary Pannal, was written by Chris Gibson.

In an episode of the 2021 British sitcom Ladhood, characters spend the night in an area said to be haunted by Pannal.

References

People executed for witchcraft
Cunning folk
1603 deaths
Year of birth uncertain
Executed people from West Yorkshire
People from Castleford
Witch trials in England